The 1957–58 Scottish Second Division was won by Stirling Albion who, along with second placed Dunfermline Athletic, were promoted to the First Division. Berwick Rangers finished bottom.

Table

References 

 Scottish Football Archive

Scottish Division Two seasons
2
Scot